Senator Hammond may refer to:

Charles Hammond (lawyer and journalist) (1779–1840), Ohio State Senate
Chauncey B. Hammond (1882–1952), New York State Senate
Edward Hammond (politician) (1812–1882), Maryland State Senate
Jabez Delano Hammond (1778–1855), New York State Senate
James Henry Hammond (1807–1864), U.S. Senator from South Carolina from 1857 to 1860
Jay Hammond (1922–2005), Alaska State Senate
Jim Hammond (Idaho politician) (born 1950), Idaho State Senate
Johnie Hammond (born 1932), Iowa State Senate
Samuel H. Hammond (1809–1878), New York State Senate
Samuel Hammond (1757–1842), Georgia State Senate
Stephen H. Hammond (1828–1910), New York State Senate